Margaret Howe (born 11 May 1958) is a Canadian sprinter. She competed in the women's 100 metres at the 1976 Summer Olympics. She won a silver medal in the 4 x 100 metres relay at the 1978 Commonwealth Games.

References

1958 births
Living people
Athletes (track and field) at the 1976 Summer Olympics
Canadian female sprinters
Olympic track and field athletes of Canada
Athletes from Vancouver
Athletes (track and field) at the 1978 Commonwealth Games
Commonwealth Games silver medallists for Canada
Commonwealth Games medallists in athletics
Olympic female sprinters
20th-century Canadian women
Medallists at the 1978 Commonwealth Games